Wicked Whisper (foaled  March 31st, 2017) is an American Thoroughbred racehorse and the winner of the 2019 Frizette Stakes.

Career

Wicked Whisper's first race was on August 25, 2019, at Saratoga, where she came in first. 

Her second race was the October 6th, 2019, Grade-1 Frizette Stakes, where she came in first. 

Her third race and final race of the 2019 season took place on November 1, 2019, where she finished a disappointing fifth place at the 2019 Breeders' Cup Juvenile Fillies.

Pedigree

References

2017 racehorse births